The Healing is a 2012 Filipino supernatural horror film directed by Chito S. Roño, starring Vilma Santos and Kim Chiu. The film was released nationwide on July 25, 2012. The film is also part of the celebration of Santos' 50 years in show business.

Plot
Seth brings her father Odong, a stroke victim, to Manang Elsa, a faith healer. Afterwards, she sees a man in line being brought inside after collapsing.

The following day, Seth is met by a fully healed Odong. Amazed by his grandfather's recovery, Seth's estranged son Jed asks his mother to take his half-sister Cookie, who is suffering from glomerulonephritis, to Elsa. Seth refuses, not wanting to get in trouble with her ex-husband, but eventually gives them the address.

At a party to celebrate her father's recovery, Seth is approached by guests seeking help. Her housekeeper Alma has a strange growth on her foot preventing her from working abroad; policeman Ding suffers from psoriasis; Chona suffers from goitre; Greta has a lump in her breast, and Cacai, the young daughter of Cita, is blind. Eventually, the group goes to seek Elsa, who cures all of them. On the way home, Seth crosses paths with Jed and Cookie on their way to Elsa.

A few days after they are healed, Seth invites Chona to go to Ding's wedding reception but Chona just smiles and goes home. Afterwards she is found dead after stabbing a bystander and slashing her own neck with a knife. At her wake, Chona's husband Rex tells Seth that Chona had seen a crow in her dream before she died. The others who were healed speak out about having had the same dream. The following day, Seth finds out on the news that Dodi, a patient of Elsa, went on a killing spree at a gym and held his partner hostage before killing him and himself with a piece of broken glass, triggering speculation among Seth and her neighbors. 

That night, Seth sees Greta in her home. As Seth calls her, Greta looks back by stretching her neck backwards. Greta then stabs her husband Ruben, who runs outside for help, but is decapitated with a machete by Greta, who goes back inside and hangs herself after trying to kill her sons. The next day Ding goes on a shooting spree before being shot by his colleagues while raiding a sex den. It turns out that the people Seth saw were actually doppelgangers, who demonized the images of the people who were healed before their deaths. Seth asks her father if he had dreamt of the crow, but tells her he had a wet dream. Seth and Cita decide to confront Elsa about the chain of deaths, only to be informed by her brother Melchor that she, along with his wife, had been killed by Dario, the man who collapsed as Seth and her father left the healing, and who had actually suffered a fatal heart attack at that moment. Melchor reveals that Elsa unknowingly "cured" the dead, and now the life that was used to resurrect him was the lives of the following patients that Elsa cured after him. Melchor tells her that the only way to destroy the curse is to kill Dario again.

Seth sets out to warn the others, but sees Alma's doppelganger walk down the street towards her dormitory. By the time Seth arrives, a possessed Alma goes on a killing spree before setting herself on fire. Afraid for her daughter's life, Cita brings Cacai to a Daoist temple to be guarded by monks. Seth sees Cacai's image and warns Cita. However, she is distracted by a dragon dance and loses Cacai who is then possessed by her doppelganger. Cacai massacres the monks using a ceremonial axe and impales herself on a flagpole. Seth is then haunted by the spirits of the victims, who blame her for their deaths. Seth apologizes to Cita, who tells her to save Cookie.

Seth and Jed take Cookie to a safehouse and to monitor her with CCTV cameras. Seth visits Dario in jail to poison him and end the curse. Dario reveals that he is no longer the same person but a different entity and warns her that those who have been cured by Elsa will be possessed by their own alter-egos and their souls shall be offered to him unless he is killed, which Seth is reluctant to do. When she returns to Cookie's safehouse, she is attacked by her doppelganger, whom she electrocutes with a toaster. Seth then watches a news report about a suicide bomber, who was also healed by Elsa, detonating on a bus.

Days later, Jed learns through CCTV footage that Cookie has been possessed by her doppelganger and calls Seth. At her father's birthday party, Seth is visited by a normal-looking Cookie, who kills her houseboy Boni. As Seth receives Jed's call, Cookie stabs her. Jed arrives and tries to stop Cookie from killing her. But Cookie's doppelganger touches Jed, creating another doppelganger in his image who then tries to kill Seth. At the prison, Dario anticipates the new life that will be transported to him, but is shot dead by Melchor. A crow falls from the sky, signifying the end of the curse and the vanishing of the doppelgangers. An unconscious Cookie is woken up by Seth and Jed.

Cast

Main cast

 Vilma Santos as Seth
 Kim Chiu as Cookie

Supporting cast

 Janice de Belen as Cita
 Pokwang as Alma
 Robert Arevalo as Odong
 Martin del Rosario as Jed
 Mark Gil as Val
 Carmi Martin as Bles
 Cris Villanueva as Ding
 Allan Paule as Ruben
 Ynez Veneracion as Greta
 Ces Quesada as Chona
 Abby Bautista as Cacai
 Daria Ramirez as Manang Elsa
 Chinggoy Alonzo† as Dodi

Guest cast

 Simon Ibarra as Rex
 Mon Confiado as Gay Lover
 Cris Pasturan as Boni
 Nikki Valdez as Lani
 Joel Torre as Melchor
 Jhong Hilario as Dario Mata
 Ina Feleo as Mrs. Mata
 Mercedes Cabral as Kell
 Ana Capri as Melchor's Wife

Release

International screening
Here are some selected international screening dates and venues of The Healing:

Reception

Box office performance
According to Box Office Mojo, the film grossed 74 million pesos in its first two weeks. The film grossed P104.6 million. It became the third Filipino film of 2012 to gross over 100 million.

Ratings
The Cinema Evaluation Board of the Philippines gave this film a "Graded A", meaning the film will not pay taxes from the gross revenue of the film earned from the box office.

Star Cinema released two versions of the film, one is the censored, wider release, which is rated R-13 while the other one is director's cut, limited release, which is rated R-18.

See also
 List of ghost films

References

External links
 

2012 films
Religious horror films
Philippine supernatural horror films
Films about spirit possession
2010s Tagalog-language films
Philippine ghost films
Supernatural thriller films
Star Cinema films
Films directed by Chito S. Roño
Films about faith healing